Moneuptychia is a genus of satyrid butterflies found in the Neotropical realm.

Species
Listed alphabetically:
Moneuptychia giffordi Freitas, E.O. Emery & Mielke, 2010
Moneuptychia griseldis (Weymer, 1911)
Moneuptychia itapeva Freitas, 2007
Moneuptychia melchiades (Butler, 1877)
Moneuptychia paeon (Godart, [1824])
Moneuptychia soter (Butler, 1877)
Moneuptychia umuarama (Ebert & Dias, 1997)

References

 , 2007: A new species of Moneuptychia Forster (Lepidoptera: Satyrinae, Euptychiina) from the highlands of Southeastern Brazil. Neotropical Entomology 36 (6): 919-925. Full article: .
 , 2010: A new species of Moneuptychia Forster (Lepidoptera: Satyrinae: Euptychiina) from central Brazil. Neotropical Entomology 39 (1): 83-90. Full article: .

Euptychiina
Butterfly genera
Taxa named by Walter Forster (entomologist)